The Marshall Trap is a chess opening  in Petrov's Defence named after Frank Marshall.

The trap
1. e4 e5 2. Nf3 Nf6
The trap begins with Black playing Petrov's Defence.

3. Nxe5 d6 4. Nf3 Nxe4 5. d4 d5 6. Bd3 Bd6 7. 0-0 0-0 8. c4 Bg4 9. cxd5 f5 10. Re1? (see diagram)
White should play 10.Nc3 instead.

10... Bxh2+!
An unexpected blow.

11. Kxh2
If 11.Nxh2, then 11...Bxd1.

11...Nxf2
Black forks the white queen and bishop, forcing the queen to move.

12. Qe2 Nxd3 13. Qxd3 Bxf3 14. Qxf3 Qh4+
Followed by 15...Qxe1 winning the e1-rook. Black has a winning material advantage.

References

Chess traps